"Hurricane Jane" is a song by American indie rock band Black Kids. It was released as the second single from their debut album Partie Traumatic in the UK by Almost Gold Recordings on June 23, 2008. A demo version of the song appeared on the band's 2007 EP Wizard of Ahhhs. It also featured as the soundtrack of Konami game, Pro Evolution Soccer 2010.

The chorus lyric "it's Friday night and I ain't got nobody" is borrowed from Sam Cooke's song "Another Saturday Night", which has the lyric "another Saturday night and I ain't got nobody."

Track listings
All songs by Black Kids.

7" single (white vinyl)
 "Hurricane Jane"
 "Power in the Blood"

7" single (orange vinyl)
 "Hurricane Jane"
 "You Only Call Me When You're Crying"

CD single
 "Hurricane Jane"
 "Hurricane Jane (The Cansecos Remix)"

Music video
The music video for "Hurricane Jane" was filmed in London in April 2008 and directed by Rozan & Schmeltz.

Personnel
 Owen Holmes – bass guitar
 Kevin Snow – drums
 Dawn Watley – keyboards and vocals
 Ali Youngblood – keyboards and vocals
 Reggie Youngblood – guitar and vocals

Chart performance

References

External links
 Official Black Kids website
 "Hurricane Jane" music video at YouTube

2008 singles
Black Kids songs
2008 songs